Eggen may refer to

 Eggen (Betten), a heritage site in the municipality of Betten in the Swiss canton of Valais
 Eggen (Eggerberg), a settlement in the municipality of Eggerberg in the Swiss canton of Valais
 Eggen (Simplon), a heritage site in the municipality of Simplon in the Swiss canton of Valais
 Eggen (surname), a Norwegian surname

See also
 Eagan (disambiguation)